Glenn Bryant Stearns (born 1963) is an American businessman, and the founder of Stearns Lending. He is the star of the Discovery Channel's show Undercover Billionaire, and subsequent founder of Underdog BBQ in Erie, Pennsylvania.

Early life
Stearns was born in 1963 in Silver Spring, Maryland. His father was a printer and his mother was a grocery store clerk and house cleaner. The family lived in a low-income apartment complex in the suburbs of Washington D.C. Stearns was a socially adept child but struggled in school. He was diagnosed with dyslexia, but his parents kept this from him. He was humiliated when he failed the fourth grade. Stearns' parents divorced when he was 17.

Career
Stearns founded Stearns Lending in 1989. He was chief executive officer (CEO) from its founding until May 2012 when Stearns named Brian Hale, former president and national production executive of MetLife Home Loans, as his successor. Stearns Lending was the fifth-largest privately held mortgage lender in the US in 2013.

Personal life
When Stearns was 14 years old, Stearns' eldest child, Charlene, was born. Charlene's mother is a woman named Kathy who was 17 at that time. Charlene now manages Glenn's escrow company.

In October 2003, Stearns married Mindy Burbano, who was an entertainment reporter for Entertainment Tonight and KTLA in Los Angeles. They live in Jackson Hole, Wyoming.

Apart from his eldest daughter Charlene, Stearns has three sons named Skyler, Colby, and Trevor and two daughters who often appear on Mindy's Instagram. Stearns also has two grandchildren.

In 2004, Stearns and Burbano appeared on the TBS reality TV show, The Real Gilligan's Island as "the millionaire and his wife", and he "won" the competition. In 2014, he was diagnosed with cancer, which inspired him to do reality TV. In 2019, the Discovery Channel TV show, Undercover Billionaire followed Stearns as he built a startup company from scratch. During filming of the show he had a recurrence of cancer.

References

1963 births
Living people
American company founders
People from Silver Spring, Maryland
Participants in American reality television series
Reality show winners